Vuk samotnjak ("Lone Wolf") is a Yugoslav children's film released in 1972.

External links
 
 Croatian film archive: List of Croatian films from 1944 to 2006

1972 films
Croatian-language films
Yugoslav children's films
Jadran Film films
Croatian children's films
Films about dogs